Tomasz Lenz (born December 8, 1968 in Mogilno) is a Polish politician. He was elected to the Sejm on September 25, 2005 getting 9472 votes in 5 Toruń district. He was a candidate from the Civic Platform list.

See also
Members of Polish Sejm 2005-2007

External links
Tomasz Lenz - parliamentary page - includes declarations of interest, voting record, and transcripts of speeches.

Members of the Polish Sejm 2005–2007
Civic Platform politicians
1968 births
Living people
Members of the Polish Sejm 2007–2011
Members of the Polish Sejm 2011–2015
Members of the Polish Sejm 2015–2019
Members of the Polish Sejm 2019–2023
People from Mogilno